Tsuen Wan West, formerly Lai Hing from 1994 to 2015, is one of the 19 constituencies in the Tsuen Wan District of Hong Kong.

The constituency loosely covers The Dynasty and part of the Belvedere Garden and Bayview Garden in Tsuen Wan with the estimated population of 16,058.

Councillors represented

Election results

2010s

2000s

1990s

1980s

References

Constituencies of Hong Kong
Constituencies of Tsuen Wan District Council
1982 establishments in Hong Kong
Constituencies established in 1982
1985 disestablishments in Hong Kong
Constituencies disestablished in 1985
1994 establishments in Hong Kong
Constituencies established in 1994
Tsuen Wan